This article is a collection of statewide polls for the 2016 United States presidential election. The polls listed here, by state are from January 1 to August 31, 2016 and provide early data on opinion polling between a possible Republican candidate against a possible Democratic candidate

Note: Some states had not conducted polling yet or no updated polls were present from January 1 to August 31, 2016.

Alabama
9 electoral votes (Republican in 2008) 60%–39%(Republican in 2012) 61%–38%

Alaska
3 electoral votes (Republican in 2008) 59%–38%(Republican in 2012) 55%–41%

Four-way race

Arizona
11 electoral votes (Republican in 2008) 53%–45%(Republican in 2012) 53%–44%

Four-way race

Arkansas
6 electoral votes (Republican in 2008) 59%–39%(Republican in 2012) 61%–37%

Three-way race

California
55 electoral votes (Democratic in 2008) 61%–37%(Democratic in 2012) 60%–37%

Three-way race

Four-way race

Colorado
9 electoral votes (Democratic in 2008) 54%–45%(Democratic in 2012) 51%–46%

Two-way race

Four-way race

Connecticut
7 electoral votes (Democratic in 2008) 61%–38%(Democratic in 2012) 58%–41%

Four-way race

Delaware
3 electoral votes (Democratic in 2008) 62%–37%(Democratic in 2012) 59%–40%

Three-way race

District of Columbia
3 electoral votes (Democratic in 2008) 92%–7%(Democratic in 2012) 91%–7%

No polling was conducted in 2016

Florida

29 electoral votes (Democratic in 2008) 51%–48%(Democratic in 2012) 50%–49%

Georgia
16 electoral votes (Republican in 2008) 52%–47%(Republican in 2012) 53%–45%

Three-way race

Four-way race

Idaho
4 electoral votes (Republican in 2008) 61%–36%(Republican in 2012) 64%–32%

Four-way race

Illinois
20 electoral votes (Democratic in 2008) 62%–37%(Democratic in 2012) 58%–41%

Three-way race

Four-way race

Indiana

11 electoral votes(Democratic in 2008) 50%–49%   (Republican in 2012) 54%–44%

Three-way race

Iowa
6 electoral votes (Democratic in 2008) 54%–44%(Democratic in 2012) 52%–46%

Four-way race

Kansas

6 electoral votes(Republican in 2008) 56%–42%   (Republican in 2012) 60%–38%

Three-way race

Four-way race

Kentucky

8 electoral votes(Republican in 2008) 57%–41%   (Republican in 2012) 60%–38%

Four-way race

Louisiana

8 electoral votes(Republican in 2008) 59%–40%   (Republican in 2012) 58%–41%

Two-way race

Maine

4 electoral votes (Statewide vote worth 2 EVs; 1st and 2nd congressional districts worth 1 EV each)(Democratic in 2008) 58%–40%   (Democratic in 2012) 56%–41%

Maryland

10 electoral votes(Democratic in 2008) 62%–36%   (Democratic in 2012) 62%–36%

Four-way race

Massachusetts

11 electoral votes(Democratic in 2008) 62%–36%   (Democratic in 2012) 61%–38%

Michigan

16 electoral votes(Democratic in 2008) 57%–41%   (Democratic in 2012) 54%–45%

Three-way race

Four-way race

Minnesota

10 electoral votes(Democratic in 2008) 54%–44%   (Democratic in 2012) 53%–45%

Missouri

10 electoral votes(Republican in 2008) 49.4%–49.2%   (Republican in 2012) 53%–44%

Three-way race

Four-way race

Nevada

6 electoral votes(Democratic in 2008) 55%–43%   (Democratic in 2012) 52%–46%

Two-way race

Three-way

Four-way race

Five-way race

New Hampshire

4 electoral votes(Democratic in 2008) 54%–45%   (Democratic in 2012) 52%–46%

Three-way race

Four-way race

New Jersey
14 electoral votes(Democratic in 2008) 57%–42%   (Democratic in 2012) 58%–41%

Three-way race

Four-way race

New Mexico
5 electoral votes(Democratic in 2008) 57%–42%   (Democratic in 2012) 53%–43%

Three-way race

Four-way race

New York

29 electoral votes(Democratic in 2008) 63%–36%   (Democratic in 2012) 63%–35%

Three-way race

Four-way race

North Carolina

15 electoral votes(Democratic in 2008) 50%–49%   (Republican in 2012) 50%–48%

Three-way race

Four-way race

Ohio

18 electoral votes(Democratic in 2008) 51%–47%   (Democratic in 2012) 51%–48%

Three-way race

Four-way race

Oklahoma
7 electoral votes(Republican in 2008) 66%–34%   (Republican in 2012) 67%–33%

Three-way race

Oregon
7 electoral votes(Democratic in 2008) 57%–40%   (Democratic in 2012) 54%–42%

Four-way race

Pennsylvania
20 electoral votes(Democratic in 2008) 54%–44%   (Democratic in 2012) 52%–47%

Three-way race

Four-way race

South Carolina

9 electoral votes(Republican in 2008) 54%–45%   (Republican in 2012) 55%–44%

Four-way race

Tennessee

11 electoral votes(Republican in 2008) 57%–42%   (Republican in 2012) 59%–39%

Texas

38 electoral votes(Republican in 2008) 55%–44%   (Republican in 2012) 57%–41%

Three-way race

Five-way race

Utah

6 electoral votes(Republican in 2008) 62%–34%   (Republican in 2012) 73%–25%

Three-way race

Four-way race

Six-way race

Vermont

3 electoral votes(Democratic in 2008) 67%–30%   (Democratic in 2012) 67%–31%

Three-way race

Virginia

13 electoral votes  (Democratic in 2008) 53%–46%   (Democratic in 2012) 51%–47%

Three-way race

Four-way race

Washington
12 electoral votes(Democratic in 2008) 57%–40%   (Democratic in 2012) 56%–41%

Four-way race

West Virginia
5 electoral votes(Republican in 2008) 56%–43%   (Republican in 2012) 62%–36%

Four-way race

Wisconsin
10 electoral votes  (Democratic in 2008) 56%–42%   (Democratic in 2012) 53%–46%

Three-way race

Four-way race

References

Opinion polling for the 2016 United States presidential election